D119 is the main state road on the island of Lastovo in Croatia, connecting the towns of Ubli and Lastovo to a ferry port in Lastovo, from where Jadrolinija ferries fly to the mainland, docking in Split and the D410 state road.

The road, as well as all other state roads in Croatia, is managed and maintained by Hrvatske ceste, a state-owned company.

Road junctions and populated areas

Sources

State roads in Croatia
Transport in Dubrovnik-Neretva County
Lastovo